is a comedy manga series written and illustrated by Maruboro Akai. The manga started serialization in the Japanese shōnen manga magazine Monthly Dragon Age in 2004.

An anime adaptation directed by Masayuki Sakoi, and animated by Madhouse, aired between April and June 2008.

Plot
Naeka Fujiwara is the granddaughter of a billionaire and the heir to his fortune. She is pursued by those who desire her inheritance. In order to protect her from harm and ensure her proper upbringing, the amazing and fearsome Kogarashi, the masked Maid Guy, is summoned.

Characters

The main protagonist. A student of Shuuhou Seiha Private School, ranked Fukushou (second-in-command) of the girl's kendo club and in line for a large inheritance. Naeka presents a unique challenge to Kogarashi; though attractive and extremely busty for her age (and the biggest of the manga. Only in a Kōsuke´s dream her position is in danger by Fubuki), Naeka speaks of walking the "path of the sword" like a warrior mainly to escape from her failed traumatic attempt at love where she accidentally poisoned her crush with a home-cooked bento. She is independent, stubborn, can be a lethal cook, not too bright and coarsely speaks her mind. Naeka suffers both friends and enemies for her figure and manners, and has to tolerate the demanding "service" of Kogarashi -- but through it all, she can still be upbeat and positive. She is depicted as a good swordswoman and will violently attack anyone who offends her with a live blade if necessary, including her own brother.

The title character. A towering, super-powered man in a maid uniform with facial features that includes a grin showing his sharp teeth and glowing eyes; he is also known for his sinister "Kukukukuku" laugh, most characters refer him as a "Bakemono" because of it. Kogarashi is boldly confident in his numerous Maid Guy abilities, from cooking & cleaning to USB connectivity and X-ray vision, even claiming to have 37 senses. He is extremely loyal to Naeka, but unafraid to criticize her faults. He also acts the same way towards his fellow maid, Fubuki. Ironically, Kogarashi himself lacks any regard for personal space or decency; hence, he is normally not depicted as pervert compared to other characters, usually brushing off the opposite sex as they were an animal implying he's clueless about women; because of it he is as much a source of problems for the Fujiwara home as he is the solution. Zenjurō even notes to Fubuki that using Kogarashi to protect her is like using poison to fight poison; Fubuki even tells Naeka to treat him as a beast. Despite being a kind person at heart (demonstrating helping various people in town with his master's permission), his mannerisms usually gets Naeka, as well as Fubuki, into unwanted trouble and humiliation, leading to the running gag of the series of him being beaten violently, yet comically, by Fubuki and/or Naeka. He states that he never gets sick and can almost instantly recover from injury but a whistle given to Naeka by Fubuki can hurt and possibly kill him, but it becomes broken in the beginning of the second episode (when Naeka slams it, accidentally, in her desk drawer).

A beautiful 19-year-old maid, who is also assigned to the Fujiwara household. She is tasked with both the Fujiwaras' daily care, and keeping Kogarashi under control. She has great skill as a maid and guardian, demonstrating ninja-like abilities; however, despite all of this, she is usually referred as a "clumsy maid" much to her annoyance, most of it coming from her fellow maid, Kogarashi. It's also implied in the anime she "disrobes when drunk", a habit she is quite aware of but tries to keep it secret. Fubuki is usually serious and calm, but is not above flattery and can be prideful at times. Both in the manga and anime, she is quite reserved about showing her attractive body (which includes a big bust ... despite the fact that Naeka´s breasts are still bigger), resulting in many admirers which includes Kosuke; and will quickly punish Kogarashi for his antics with a nail-studded baseball bat, kunai or any other weapon she carries in her arsenal. At one point is referred to as "the world's greatest maid guy tamer."

Naeka's overweight little brother, a fan of maids and eroge. He is good-natured, and has a normal sibling rivalry with Naeka. Kōsuke seems to get along best with his grandfather, and is very thankful for being bestowed with Fubuki. His otaku tendencies sometimes gets him into trouble with the others. When forced to diet, Kōsuke is shown to be very handsome.

Naeka and Kōsuke's wealthy and doting grandfather. Concerned that both his family line is in danger, and his surviving grandchildren might disgrace them, Zenjurō hires the two maids to ensure their safety, as well as the Fujiwara fortune. He commissioned an expensive lounge just to watch his granddaughter's kendo match and closed school for a day, showing the kind of vast influence their family has. He also genuinely loves his grandchildren and even was ready to have an ambassador and his son deported or arrested for spying and did not care if it became an international incident all because the ambassador's son groped Naeka's butt.

Naeka's friend and fellow teammate in the kendo club. They are usually seen eating lunch together or at practice with Miwa. Eiko is usually the first to yell at her busty classmate for her shallow or selfish comments. She is highly envious of Naeka's bust size and whenever she gets annoyed by Naeka's comments she commonly assaults her friend by groping her breasts. Her desire for bigger breasts is such that she willingly becomes Urashima Taro's mind controlled slave in exchange for him using his powers to enlarge her bust size. At the same time, Eiko does enjoy her friendship with Naeka, scheming for their kendo club, wanting in on the latest gossip, or needing help with the maid cafe where she and Miwa works.

A friend and classmate to Naeka. A boyish, short-haired and more rational member of the kendo club, Miwa is a decently performing student. Though she sometimes comes off as insensitive to her friend, she does not deny Naeka's skillful swordsmanship and determination. She works with Eiko at the maid cafe "D'erlanger", that holds a rivalry with a neighboring shop.
Male Kendo Club
Three boys from Shūhō Seiha Private School who show up randomly throughout the series. They are an unwelcome sight to Naeka, as they loudly and openly proclaim their love for her generous bust. In the anime, they are not referred to by name, though they do address their "Leader" as such. In the anime during a time where the "Leader" lost his memory, he revealed that he only likes Naeka's breasts because they are Naeka's and shown when he had no reaction towards other women with large breasts, hinting at him having deeper feelings for her then just parts love. However, he later was hit in the head again, causing him to forget the entire time he was with Naeka.

Saki is another girl attending Shūhō Seiha Private School, who is in love with Naeka. She is so obsessed, she jealously attacks anyone else who attempts peek at Naeka before she does. Saki's efforts are sometimes thwarted by Kogarashi, though he refuses to harm her directly. So far, no character has referred to Saki by name in the anime.
Maguro Uomatsu

An omnipresent fish market salesman, both in the manga and anime. Uomatsu seldom interacts with the cast directly, but does acknowledge Kogarashi's superiority and usefulness at times.

Introducing herself as "Liz", she is a transfer student to Shūhō Seiha Private School. A thirteen-year-old child prodigy of English descent, Liz is extremely wealthy herself, a remarkable kendo student and immediately treats Naeka as her rival. Liz takes every opportunity and resource available to humiliate Naeka, displaying a mildly unsettling foot fetish (which is never focused on in the anime). She takes on the persona of "Strawberry Mask" as a disguise, even though everyone can easily tell who she is. In the anime, after her encounter with Kogarashi, she became deathly afraid of crows to the point she wets her bed.

 (Shizuku), and Hiroe Oka (Tsurara)
Twin ninja maids who serve Liz, much like the Maid Guy & Fubuki. They are also underlings of Hyochuka the Masked Woman. Although both are twenty-one years of age, Shizuku is the more youthful of the two. She has a tendency to speak out of turn to others, getting her into trouble often. Tsurara is the mature twin, upholding very strict codes of secrecy, infiltration and discipline. However, her dour attitude and voice makes her seem much older, ruining her disguises. Shizuku is usually equipped with a pair of large kunai, while her sister Tsurara wields a kusarigama.

An unapologetic and shallow young man, fixated on large breasts to the point he will greet women by addressing their breasts. Hendrick uses a hypnotic effect from his eyes to command girls, who then willingly do and say anything to please him. He also has his family's wealth to exploit, but he is often the victim of his own single-minded lust. This fixation led to his younger sister Liz's inferiority complex because of her brother complex, where she despises any girl with large breasts (thus her distaste for Naeka).

A huge and brazen student from Shugendō High School, another rival to Naeka, who constantly challenges her every chance she gets. Arayashiki is utterly consumed with a need for revenge, after an embarrassing match with Naeka where the results left her disrobed (to the horror of the audience). Naeka fears having to risk Arayashiki's wrath and suffer the same humiliation, but Kogarashi does intervene when the situation gets out of hand. She is an extremely large muscular woman with a violent temper, a temper that usually gets her into trouble causing her to lose against Naeka.

The lowest rung successor of the inheritance and deemed a rival to Naeka; however, the majority does not take him seriously. He is usually referred as a self-styled secondary inheritor with an avant-garde style, including a strange hairstyle; due to that Kogarashi quickly detects, correctly, a twisted ambition from him. He is one of those who has sent an assassin after Naeka; in this case, his own maid Hyochuka. It is implied that after gaining the inheritance, he wants to rule the world.

Also known as The Masked Woman, is Kofujiwara's maid, whose strength and cunning is equal to both Kogarashi and Fubuki. The mask she wears is similar to Kogarashi's mask. She had threatened Naeka's grandfather and almost succeeds in killing Kogarashi using a fake whistle that's similar to what Fubuki gave Naeka. Shizuku & Tsurara, Liz's maids, are some of her underlings who aid her in missions. The rest of her underlings are just mechanical puppets she controls and uses in battle. She can also cloak herself to avoid detection and escape. Her main objective is the assassination of Naeka, so Kofujiwara can get the inheritance.

Introduced in volume five of the manga series, she is Fubuki's very youthful and attractive grandmother. She holds the title of "Maid Master" of the academy where presumably Fubuki and other maids undergo rigorous training. Arashi maintains a pleasant and playful facade, but can be temperamental, rough with discipline, and especially violent if she's called old. Shockingly, she and Zenjurō are a mutually romantic couple. Arashi is exclusive to the manga, with no appearances or references in the anime series.(she does appear with a patch over her eye at the end of episode 12, but she is unnamed and could be a sister or relative that looks like Fubuki).

The perverted, breast obsessed spirit of an ancient fisherman who lives in a deserted island. He is introduced in the later manga episodes, where it's revealed that while living he offended a big breasted goddess by gawking at her and in retaliation she sealed his spirit to a deserted island where he would never be able to look at breasts again. On his first appearance, when the main cast vacation on his island, he attempts to hypnotize the women and turn them into his big-boobed mistresses; he succeeds in controlling Miwa, Eiko and Fubuki but is beaten in combat by Naeka. After that he becomes obsessed with Naeka and he makes several attempts to enslave her, on one occasion he succeeds and temporarily turns her into his slave-girl. He has the ability to set up complex traps with fishing lines and hooks, the ability to hypnotize and possess people, the ability to make his body magnetic to women's breasts and the ability to enlarge women's breasts.

Anime episodes

References

External links
Official manga website 
Official anime website 

Fujimi Shobo manga
Kadokawa Dwango franchises
Madhouse (company)
NBCUniversal Entertainment Japan
Shōnen manga